Danilia is a genus of sea snails, marine gastropod molluscs of the family Chilodontaidae.

Previously it was considered a subgenus of Euchelus Philippi, 1847. This genus was named after the malacologist Francesco Danilo (1813- ?)

Species
Species within the genus Danilia include:
 Danilia affinis Dautzenberg & H. Fischer, 1896
 Danilia angulosa Vilvens & Heros, 2005
 Danilia boucheti Herbert, 2012
 Danilia discordata Vilvens & Heros, 2005
 Danilia eucheliformis (Nomura & Hatai, 1940)
 Danilia galeata Vilvens & Heros, 2005
 Danilia insperata Beu & Climo, 1974
 Danilia kuroshio Okutani, 1968
 † Danilia otaviana (Cantraine, 1835)
 Danilia stratmanni Poppe, Tagaro & Dekker, 2006
 Danilia telebathia Hedley, 1911
 Danilia textilis Herbert, 2012
 Danilia tinei (Calcara, 1839)
 Danilia weberi Schepman, 1908
Species brought into synonymy
 Danilia costellata (Costa, 1861): synonym of  Danilia tinei (Calcara, 1839)

References

 Vilvens C. & Héros V. 2005. New species and new records of Danilia (Gastropoda: Chilodontidae) from the Western Pacific. Novapex 6(3) : 53-64

Further reading
 NZ Mollusca
 Powell A. W. B., New Zealand Mollusca, William Collins Publishers Ltd, Auckland, New Zealand 1979 
  Herbert D.G. (2012) A revision of the Chilodontidae (Gastropoda: Vetigastropoda: Seguenzioidea) of southern Africa and the south-western Indian Ocean. African Invertebrates, 53(2): 381–502

External links

 
Chilodontaidae
Taxa named by Spiridon Brusina
Gastropod genera